Freedom for Animals (FFA) is the working name of the Captive Animals' Protection Society, a charity registered in England campaigning to end the display of animals in zoos, and the use of animals in entertainment, such as circuses, the exotic pet trade and the audio-visual industry.

History

Freedom for Animals was founded as the Captive Animals' Protection Society in 1957 by retired school teacher Irene Heaton, at a time when circuses were at their peak and all had animals.

In 1965, FFA promoted a bill to the House of Lords, sponsored by Lord Somers (who was then president of FFA) to prohibit the use of performing animals. Despite much support it was defeated by just 14 votes.

The 1970s saw FFA organising demonstrations outside circuses. Pressure increased on animal circuses in the 1980s, gaining the support of the National Council of Women and local authorities started to prohibit circuses from using council land.

From 1975 to 1997, Sir Andrew Bowden served as its National President.

In the mid-1980s FFA started a campaign to end animal acts at the prestigious Blackpool Tower Circus, where for six months of every year the animals were confined in the cellars of the tower.  Three years later, it was announced that animal acts would stop at the circus once the contract expired in 1990.  When the circus owner moved to the adjoining Pleasure Beach there were weekly demonstrations.   Backed by vets and other experts, the campaign worked and in 1997 Blackpool Pleasure Beach announced there would be no more animal circuses on its land.

Three of the charity's former directors have been given awards for their work by the RSPCA.

FFA became a registered charity in 2008.  In March 2018 FFA changed its name from the Captive Animals Protection Society to Freedom for Animals.

Campaigns
FFA has carried out investigations into both the zoo and circus industries in the UK and Ireland and has carried out and published various research projects relating to the use of animals in entertainment. The organisation founded and manages the annual Zoo Awareness Weekend event, which seeks to encourage public debate on the zoo industry from ethical, animal welfare, educational and conservation perspectives.

In 2004 it commissioned the largest and most in-depth investigation ever made into the public aquarium industry, revealing most animals to have been taken from the wild and disputing conservation claims by the industry.

In 2011 a report was released which highlighted the charity's concerns over the efficacy of legal protection of animals in zoos in England. The report raised queries over the enforcement of the law and suggested that the system of inspection for zoos that is currently in place is unworkable.

In 2012 FFA established the AnimalPledge.org scheme which seeks to encourage the media industry to refrain from the use of performing wild animals in productions. The project was established in partnership with the Ape Alliance.

In 2013 FFA launched a new campaign entitled the "Fight for Flight". The campaign seeks to outlaw the practice of pinioning of birds in zoos. The charity's research found that the practice was being carried out illegally by members of the zoo industry.

Campaigning against the use of animals in circuses has remained a core focus, supporting protests against travelling circuses around the UK.

The organisation has frequently expressed an opposition to zoos of any form.

Patrons
The charity's patrons are:
Marc Bekoff, Professor Emeritus of Ecology and Evolutionary Biology at the University of Colorado
Britta Jaschinski, photographer
Randy Malamud, professor of English at Georgia State University
Fiona Oakes, elite marathon runner
Angela Smith, Baroness Smith of Basildon, Labour Co-operative life peer and former Member of Parliament and government minister
Peter Tatchell, human rights campaigner

See also
List of animal rights groups

References

Animal charities based in the United Kingdom
Charities based in England
Organisations based in Manchester
Organizations established in 1957
1957 establishments in England
Circus-related organizations